The Sikkim Pradesh Congress Committee (SPCC) is the unit of the Indian National Congress for the state of Sikkim, India.
Its head office is situated in Gangtok.

The present President of Sikkim Pradesh Congress is Gopal Chhettri.

Electoral records 
 Sikkim Legislative Assembly election

 Lok Sabha election, Sikkim

See also
 Indian National Congress
 Congress Working Committee
 All India Congress Committee
 Pradesh Congress Committee

References

External links

Indian National Congress by state or union territory